Modern Sketch was a monthly Chinese art periodical. It ran from January 1934 through June 1937. The owner of the publication was Shao Xunmei (Zau Sinmay), and the editor was Lu Shaofei. The magazine was published by Shao Xunmei's Modern Publications Ltd., headquartered in Shanghai, and Shao Xunmei also published Modern Cinema and Modern Pictorial.

Many of the works featured in the magazine were created by students who later gained positions in the Chinese government later in the 20th century.

Andrew Jones, author of Developmental Fairy Tales, stated that Modern Sketch and its two sister publications "were famous for the quality of their production values and the graphic art (including cartoons, photomontage, and other forms) adorning their pages." The Massachusetts Institute of Technology stated that Modern Sketch had a "kaleidoscopic window onto the past" and that its content "lend blunt visual force to the major crises and contradictions that define China’s 20th century as a quintessentially modern era."

History

The magazine ran for 39 issues. Issue #26, printed February 1936, had a negative depiction of Xu Shiying, the Ambassador of China to Japan. As a result, the authorities suspended the magazine's publication beginning in March 1936, and Lu Shaofei was detained. The magazine Modern Puck (Manhua jie), edited by Wang Dunqing, had three monthly issues printed during the period the publication of Modern Sketch was suspended. MIT stated that the magazine was "nearly identical to Modern Sketch. The publication of Modern Sketch resumed in May of that year. Modern Puck continued its print run after the resumption of Modern Sketch, ending at the end of the year of 1936.

Works

The magazine had a "Jazz Age" style.

MIT stated that the magazine was made by men for men and that an indicator was the use of erotic depictions of women, including semi-naked and naked women; editor Lu Shaofei and almost all of the artists made erotic depictions of women. According to MIT, sometimes the purpose of the drawings of the women were to get attention and sometimes they were there to make political statements.

See also
 Shanghai Manhua

References

External links
 "Modern Sketch" (Archive). Colgate University Libraries.

1934 establishments in China
1937 disestablishments in China
Manhua magazines
Defunct magazines published in China
Magazines established in 1934
Magazines disestablished in 1937
Monthly magazines published in China
Chinese-language magazines